1831 census of the Ottoman Empire was the first available population information in the West. The Europeans estimates before this census, some of whom, such as William Eton, David Urquhart, Georg Hassel was based on their personal assumptions which in these publications claimed to be gathered from Ottoman court.

The "first" modern Ottoman census was conducted beginning in 1828/29 in both Europe and Anatolia. It was required after the Auspicious Incident in 1826. Many of the old customs and procedures changed at this census. Advent of the war with Russia in 1828-1829 prevented generalization of these procedures.

Result of census

Bibliography

Notes

References

Censuses in the Ottoman Empire
1831 in the Ottoman Empire
Ottoman